Senator Ballenger may refer to:

Bill Ballenger (born 1941), Michigan State Senate
Cass Ballenger (1926–2015), North Carolina State Senate
Roger Ballenger (1950–2019), Oklahoma State Senate